Dorcadion darjae is a species of beetle in the family Cerambycidae. It was described by Mikhail Leontievich Danilevsky in 2001.

The species can be traced to Central Asia.

References 

darjae
Beetles described in 2001